Bipasha (Bengali : বিপাশা) is a Sanskrit Indian feminine given name, which means "the Beas river" .

Notable people named Bipasha 
 Bipasha Basu (born January 7, 1979), Indian actress and model
 Bipasha Hayat (born March 23, 1971), Bangladeshi actress and model

Others 
 Bipasha (1962 film), directed by Agradoot
Bipasha: The Black Beauty (2006 film), directed by Shailendra Singh Rajput

Hindu given names
Indian feminine given names